-Iduronic acid (IUPAC abbr.: IdoA) is the major uronic acid component of the glycosaminoglycans (GAGs) dermatan sulfate, and heparin. It is also present in heparan sulfate, although here in a minor amount relative to its carbon-5 epimer glucuronic acid. 
 
IdoA is a hexapyranose sugar. Most hexapyranoses are stable in one of two chair conformations 1C4 or 4C1. -iduronate is different and adopts more than one solution conformation, with an equilibrium existing between three low-energy conformers. These are the 1C4 and 4C1 chair forms and an additional 2S0 skew-boat conformation.

IdoA may be modified by the addition of an O-sulfate group at carbon position 2 to form 2-O-sulfo--iduronic acid (IdoA2S).

In 2000, LK Hallak described the importance of this sugar in respiratory syncytial virus (RSV) infection. Dermatan sulfate and heparan sulfate were the only GAGs containing IdoA, and they were the only ones that inhibited RSV infection in cell culture.

When internally positioned within an oligosaccharide, the 1C4 and 2S0 conformations (shown below for IdoA2S) predominate.

Proton NMR spectroscopy can be used to track changes in the balance of this equilibrium.

References

Uronic acids